Amelanchier spicata, also referred to as the low juneberry, thicket shadbush, dwarf serviceberry, or low serviceberry (historically also called "pigeon berry"), is a species of serviceberry that has edible fruit, which are really pomes. They can be eaten raw or cooked. Amelanchier spicata has clusters of small white flowers that bloom in spring.

Amelanchier spicata is native to North America. It is a very hardy species, and is considered invasive in Scandinavia.

References

External links

 
Information from the University of Maine
Amelanchier spicata Picture

spicata
Flora of the Northeastern United States
Flora of the Southeastern United States
Flora of the North-Central United States
Flora of Eastern Canada
Flora without expected TNC conservation status